Princess Sarah is a 2007 Philippine television series based on Frances Hodgson Burnett's novel A Little Princess. It is topbilled by Sharlene San Pedro as Sarah Crewe. The series was aired on ABS-CBN's Primetime Bida evening block and worldwide on The Filipino Channel from November 12 to December 21, 2007, replacing Kokey.

The series was shot in Camp John Hay in Baguio and the Coconut Palace in Manila instead of India and London during the Victorian Era (including Second Boer War) and World War I. Unlike the 1995 Filipino film and the 1985 Japanese anime series it was based from, which in turn was based on Burnett's original novel, the teleserye adaptation took even more creative liberties from the original story, with Ram Dass being depicted as a female sorceress, Lavinia as Miss Minchin's daughter, and fantasy elements being introduced in the story.

This series was streaming on Jeepney TV YouTube channel every 7:00 pm replacing Volta.

This series was aired on Kapamilya Online Live Global last January 13 to 24, 2023 and was replacing by Mga Anghel Na Walang Langit.

Plot
Sarah Crewe studies in a boarding school for rich girls. Although motherless, Sarah is rich in love showered by her father, Captain Cristopher Crewe. But one day her father has to leave for an expedition and is lost and presumed dead.

The sufferings of Sarah begin, as she was reduced to poverty and was forced to live a life as a servant in Miss Minchin's seminary.

Cast and characters

Main characters 
 Sharlene San Pedro as Sarah Crewe
 Albert Martinez as Capt. Cristopher Crewe - the father of Sarah. Envied by other pirates for his discovered treasure map, he will soon be placed in a situation between life and death matters.
 Sheryl Cruz as Miss Maria Minchin - the owner and headmistress of the boarding school where Sarah stays. Miss Minchin has the strongest personality in the house, and she is blinded by the shine of richness. She was later revealed to be Lavinia's biological mother. In the end, she fells regret her mistakes for Sarah until she was arrested by the police twice before they sent back to jail.
 Ai-Ai delas Alas as Rama Dass (a female character of Ram Dass) - a native woman who often visits the city. In her tribe, she has high reputations and later will come to Captain Crewe's side for help. Ram Dass is the male character in the original story.
 Candy Pangilinan as Miss Amelia Minchin - the kind hearted sister of the cruel Miss Minchin. Her sister often bullies her, but at the end of the story, Amelia will make a stand against her dominating sister.
 Diether Ocampo as Master Brandon Crissford - one of the friends of Captain Crewe. Brandon lives next door to the boarding school where Sarah works as a maid.
 Sophia Baars as Lavinia Minchin Herbert - Sarah's rival on the school. She does everything to make Sarah's life as miserable as possible. As the series progress, secrets about her family will be revealed and her manners will be justified. In the end, she reconciles Sarah and Becky at the finale.
 Carlos Agassi as Phillip Burrose - deviant to the original story, the series' main villain crown was shifted to Mr. Burrows - "a play on the character Mr. Barrow of the original one". He will held Captain Crewe captive for a long time for the latter to surrender a map the former failed to retrieve during their expedition. He will blackmail the boarding school headmistress for the sake of money. In connection, Miss Minchin's character serves as a bit humorous and lighter form of a villain. He was killed by Captain Crewe.

Students 
 Noemi Oineza as Lottie Legh - the cry baby of the group.
 Khaycee Aboloc as Ermengarde St. John - Sarah's bestfriend.
 Divine Loraine Penaflor as Gertrude - Lavinia's friend that will help her on the way to getting rid of Sarah's reputation.
 Bianca Pulmano as Jessie - one of Lavinia's friends that will help Lavinia on her way to getting rid of Sarah's reputation.
 Angel Sy as Eidelweiss - former student of the dormitory and now the school ghost. She befriended Sarah and Becky and will be a great help to the two in times of distress, set aside when it comes to Miss Minchin.
 Elisia Parmisano as Princess Eidelweiss Dalfrethon
 Martina Wassertheurer as Princess Hazel Dalfrethon

Other characters
 Eunice Lagusad as Becky - one of the maids in the boarding school. Becky becomes friends with Sarah while she is still wealthy and continues to support her after she is relegated to the attic.
 Irish Fullerton as Miss Viola - the music teacher of the girls.
 Jaime Fabregas as Monsieur Dufarge - the French teacher (also Jaime Fabregas is one of the original cast in a movie version "Sarah, Ang Munting Prinsesa" who played Mr. James as a chef in a dormitory).
 Melissa Ricks as Mariette - one of the maids in the boarding school and the sister of Picolino. She will fall in love with Paul (although she's not dismissed from here job just like the 1985 Japanese anime series).
 Matt Evans as Paul - Peter's eldest brother.
 Lui Villaruz as Picolino - the resident chef of the boarding school, who is secretly in love with Amelia but he befriends Mariette, Sarah and Becky (unlike James from the 1985 Japanese anime series and 1995 live-action film).
 Bubbles Paraiso as Kalela - Brandon's partner.
 Julijo Pisk as Peter
 Helga Krapf as Antoinette - another maid in the boarding school. She openly seduces Paul in front of Mariette to gain attention and often diverts her frustrations at the young maids - Sarah and Becky as well as the bullied students Lottie and Ermengarde (similar to Mollie from the 1985 Japanese anime series and 1995 live-action film).
 France Bonnin as Matilda
 Lou Veloso as Captain Seaweed
 Lauren Novero as Orion
 Andrew Muhlach as Graham
 Precious Lara Quigaman - a cameo role as Sarah's mother where she was seen briefly in a lullaby scene and in Sarah's locket.

Animal characters
 Surya - a little monkey that belongs to Rama Dass and is very playful. Surya is the name of monkey in the anime version and also in Philippine movie version.
 Jump - Sarah's own horse given by her father. He is made of good nature and lived a happy life with Peter attending to him, until he had to leave one day.
 Mr. Chester - Chesster Tomboc. A cat that was brought by Peter to the school.
 Pedro - an iguana that was brought by Sarah to the street.
 Carl - a snake that was brought by Peter to the mall.
 Izzy - a polar bear that lives in Pasig City.
 Nebo - an owl that lives in Malabon Zoo. He also appeared on Kulilits.
 John - a lion that lives in Malabon Zoo. He also appeared on the "Lucky Me Noodles" commercials.
 Romeo - a tiger that belongs to Peter and is very ugly. Romeo's voice actor is Nash Aguas.
 Reno - a turtle that lives in Palawan.
 Julalay - an elephant that lives in Africa. Julalay's voice actor is Basty Alcances.
 Chris - a zebra that lives in Africa. Chris' voice actor is JJ Zamora.

Reception
Princess Sarah replaced Kokey in its timeslot and was expected to follow its success. The pilot episode garnered a 27.1% ratings according to AGB Nielsen in Mega Manila. It ran for only a month during the Christmas season; the finale ratings were low, only able to reach a total of 22% ratings. The highest rating was 28.5% while the lowest was 20.6%.

See also
 Sarah... Ang Munting Prinsesa
 List of programs broadcast by ABS-CBN
 List of shows previously aired by ABS-CBN
 List of telenovelas of ABS-CBN

References

External links
 
 Princess Sarah at Telebisyon.net

ABS-CBN drama series
2007 Philippine television series debuts
2007 Philippine television series endings
Philippine television series based on non-Philippine television series
2000s children's television series
Philippine drama television series
Television series by Dreamscape Entertainment Television
Filipino-language television shows
Television series about princesses
Television shows set in the Philippines